The canton of Lussac-les-Châteaux is an administrative division of the Vienne department, western France. Its borders were modified at the French canton reorganisation which came into effect in March 2015. Its seat is in Lussac-les-Châteaux.

It consists of the following communes:
 
Adriers
Asnières-sur-Blour
Bouresse
Brion
Civaux
Gençay
Gouex
L'Isle-Jourdain
Lhommaizé
Luchapt
Lussac-les-Châteaux
Mazerolles
Millac
Moussac
Mouterre-sur-Blourde
Nérignac
Persac
Queaux
Saint-Laurent-de-Jourdes
Saint-Maurice-la-Clouère
Saint-Secondin
Sillars
Usson-du-Poitou
Verrières
Le Vigeant

References

Cantons of Vienne